Gerd Weber (born 31 May 1956 in Dresden) is a former German soccer player.

Weber began his career in 1973 with SG Dynamo Dresden in the DDR-Oberliga. Between 1975 and 1980 he played 33 times as a midfielder for the East Germany national team, scoring 5 goals. He won the gold medal at the football tournament of the 1976 Summer Olympics with the East Germany Olympic team. He was a Stasi informer from 1975 onward.

In 1981, he along with two teammates (Peter Kotte and Matthias Müller), were arrested by the Stasi, just as they were to travel to Argentina for an international match. Weber had contacts to West German side 1. FC Köln, and had solicited escape plans, intending to flee to the West. Weber was sentenced to seven years and seven months' imprisonment. After eleven months he was released. However, he was banned from returning to professional football. In the summer of 1989 he fled to the West before the fall of the Berlin Wall with his family.

References

External links
 
 
 
 

1956 births
Living people
Footballers from Dresden
People from Bezirk Dresden
German footballers
East German footballers
Olympic footballers of East Germany
East Germany international footballers
Dynamo Dresden players
DDR-Oberliga players
Association football midfielders
Footballers at the 1976 Summer Olympics
Olympic gold medalists for East Germany
Olympic medalists in football
Medalists at the 1976 Summer Olympics
Recipients of the Patriotic Order of Merit in bronze
German footballers needing infoboxes
People of the Stasi